Comedian is a 2019 artwork by Italian artist Maurizio Cattelan. Created in an edition of three, it appears as a fresh banana affixed to a wall with duct tape. As a work of conceptual art, it consists of a certificate of authenticity with detailed diagrams and instructions for its proper display. Two editions of the piece sold for US$120,000 at Art Basel Miami Beach to significant media attention.

Background and description
Maurizio Cattelan is an Italian artist known for his tongue-in-cheek art, such as his 2016 creation America, a fully functional golden toilet. He previously used duct tape suspension for A Perfect Day in 1999, fastening the art dealer Massimo De Carlo to a gallery wall. At the 2019 Foire Internationale d'Art Contemporain art fair in Paris, the American conceptual interventionist Meth Fountain showed a half-eaten croissant affixed to the wall, predating Comedian by several months.

Comedian is a piece consisting of a fresh banana duct taped to a wall. Cattelan purchased the bananas at a Miami grocery store for an estimated 30 cents. The work includes a certificate of authenticity along with detailed instructions for its proper display, intended for its owner to use when displaying the work. Both the banana and the duct tape can be replaced as needed; the physical representation of Comedian is not the work itself. It was Cattelan's first artwork for a fair in over 15 years.  The piece was compared to Andy Warhol's 1967 pop art fruit. Emmanuel Perrotin, the gallerist exhibiting the work, stated Comedian is "a symbol of global trade, a double entendre, as well as a classic device for humor".

Reception
Comedian created controversy, with some writers, such as Robin Pogrebin, questioning if it was even art. The Guardian called Comedian a "questionably genius work. ... It calls to mind the old Lucile Bluth Arrested Development gag about rich people not knowing the price of a banana." Artnet wrote the piece was one of the worst of the week, and that Cattelan "somehow duped a group of collectors into buying bananas duct-taped to walls for $120,000 a pop. Seriously." USA Today deadpanned, "This piece of art is bananas – literally." Newsweek called it "humorous minimalist artwork", while ARTnews asked whether the piece was cynical or thrilling. CBS News reported, "It may be the most talked-about artwork at this year's event." On December 13, the New York Post featured Comedian on its cover. In his 2021 book The Devil in the Gallery, Noah Charney stated, "Comedian is neither beautiful nor does it exhibit skill, so it represents the Duchampian path." In his book Beauty (and the Banana), author Brian C. Nixon stated, "To say the least, Comedian is a commentary on the wild world of contemporary art, communicating how culture understands, interprets, and engages with the arts."

Purchases
The piece was released in an edition of three; two were purchased for $120,000 USD at Art Basel. The selling price garnered significant media attention. One edition was purchased by Sarah Andelman, a founder of Colette. Another edition was sold to Billy and Beatrice Cox, who stated:

We are acutely aware of the blatant absurdity of the fact that Comedian is an otherwise inexpensive and perishable piece of produce and a couple of inches of duct tape. When we saw the public debate sparked about art and our society, we decided to purchase it. We knew we were taking a risk, but ultimately we sense that Cattelan’s banana will become an iconic historical object.

In August 2020 artist Damien Hirst complained to the media that he was unable to purchase the piece and had offered to trade any of his own works for it with Cattelan; Cattelan replied that the piece had sold out. The following month Comedian was donated to the Guggenheim Museum, with instructions and diagrams for its installation and display.

Intervention
After its sale, while still on exhibit at Art Basel, Georgian performance artist David Datuna ate the piece in an intervention he called Hungry Artist. The banana was replaced later that day. No legal action was taken against him, though he was asked to leave the fair. Datuna stated, "What we perceive as materialism is nothing but social conditioning. Any meaningful interaction with an object could turn it to art. I am a hungry artist, and I am hungry for new interactions."

Interpretations
Following a flurry of publicity, a number of commentators satirized or interpreted Comedian. Designer Sebastian ErraZuriz taped a dildo to a wall with duct tape and listed it for sale for $12,000. Cryptocurrency artist CryptoGraffiti created The Commodity, "which instructed collectors to find and claim a banana with a bitcoin key address carved into it". Actress Brooke Shields taped a banana to her forehead with blue tape and posted it to Instagram with the caption, "An expensive selfie". Designer Simon Porte Jacquemus "created a merch opportunity when posting a duct-taped yellow version of [his] micro Le Chiquito bag". Popeyes Chicken joined with the San Paul Gallery Urban Art in Miami to create The Sandwich, a chicken sandwich taped to a white wall with duct tape; it was listed at $120,003.99 and "became a viral sensation in its own right". Multiple other brands followed suit, including the New York Mets, Burger King, Hostess, Perrier, Carrefour, Sweetgreen, Absolut, and Bobbi Brown.

Removal
In the morning on Sunday, December 8, 2019, Comedian was removed from the fair. The curators removed the piece because they were afraid other art would be damaged by queuing crowds. After the removal, the gallery released the following statement: Comedian, with its simple composition, ultimately offered a complex reflection of ourselves. We would like to warmly thank all those who participated in this memorable adventure, as well as to our colleagues. We sincerely apologize to all the visitors of the fair who today will not be able to participate in Comedian.

After the removal, Perrotin created a social media account dedicated to the piece. One of the walls featuring the piece was later vandalized with the text "Epstien didn't kill himself"  in lipstick, which was soon covered by the art fair.

Court case
Artist Joe Morford has filed a suit against Cattelan for copyright infringement of his 2000 work titled Banana & Orange. In July 2022, a federal judge in the Southern District of Florida denied Cattelan's motion to dismiss the case.

See also
 2019 in art

References

External links
 Cattelan Banana on Instagram

2019 works
Adhesive tape
Bananas in popular culture
Conceptual art
Vandalized works of art in the United States
Works by Italian people